Walpeup  is a town in the Mallee region of north west Victoria.

History
The township was settled when the railway arrived, a full post office opening on 16 December 1912. The area of the locality contains the smaller area of Paigne which had a post office open from 1912 until 1916.

Education
The Mallee Research Station at Walpeup was established in 1922 to research dryland farming in the Mallee. It is a campus of the Sunraysia Institute of TAFE. It also has a Bureau of Meteorology automatic weather station.

Walpeup Primary School opened on 3 June 1912 in the "Little White Hall", with a one-room school building being built in 1914. A second room was added in 1927. The school was "de-staffed" from April 2015, with the last five students having to transfer to Underbool school.

Walpeup South State School (No. 3929), alternatively known as Hungry Hut, opened in 1912 and closed in 1951. The building was later moved and served as the dressing shed at the Walpeup Recreation Reserve.

Facilities
The main tourist attractions in Walpeup are the Walpeup Memorial Hall (Glen Street) and the Dryland Gardens (Creagan Street).  The Hall houses a large collection of historic photographs of locals who served in either World War, a "welcome home" banner from the First World War — only found within the last five years and now restored and displayed — and a hand-sewn community mural tapestry created in 1989.  The Dryland Gardens, on the corner of Glen and Creagan streets, display many native trees and shrubs from around the local region and Australia, particularly a large variety of Eremophilas.  The garden is tended by local volunteers.

Travellers can stay in their own caravans or tents at the wayside stop on the corner of Creagan Street and Murphy Road. The wayside stop contains a covered barbecue area as well as well maintained play equipment and lawn.  Within 100 metres of the wayside stop is Shubert's Walk, a nature walk displaying many native trees and shrubs in their natural setting.

Sport
With its neighbouring township Underbool, Walpeup used to field Australian rules football teams (Walpeup-Underbool) in the Mallee Football League until the league was disbanded at the end of 2015. Golfers play at the course of the Walpeup Golf Club on Patchewollock Road.

References

External links

Towns in Victoria (Australia)
Mallee (Victoria)